John F. Burke (July 22, 1922 – 2011) was an American medical researcher at Harvard University widely known for his co-invention of synthetic skin in 1981, together with Dr. Ioannis V. Yannas.

Burke was also widely noted for developing a system of infection control in hospitals and showing that antibiotics given before surgery lower risks of post-operative infections.
Burke was head of the Shriners Burns Institute and chief of trauma services at Massachusetts General Hospital, a professor of surgery at Harvard University.

Life 
Burke was born in Peoria, Illinois on July 22, 1922. He received his medical degree from Harvard University.

References 

1922 births
2011 deaths
20th-century American inventors
American medical researchers
People from Peoria, Illinois
Harvard Medical School alumni